In dentistry, open flap debridement is a periodontal procedure in which the supporting alveolar bone and root surfaces of teeth are exposed by incising the gingiva to provide increased access for scaling and root planing.  While the efficacy of this treatment is debated, it is almost always performed ancillary to any osseous resective or regenerative periodontal procedures.

References

Dentistry procedures
Periodontology